The River Isle (also known as the River Ile) flows from its source near Combe St Nicholas, through Somerset, England and discharges into the River Parrett south of Langport near Midelney.

Several small springs merge into the river near Wadeford it then flows north past Donyatt, Ilminster, Puckington, and Isle Abbotts, before joining the Parrett. As a result, several mills were built on the upper reaches of the river. At least one mill was in existence at the time of the Domesday Book in 1086. These mills were an important part of the local economy connecting with the wool trade.

The road bridge over the river at Knowle St Giles is a Grade II listed building.

A lock was built at the junction with the River Parrett, to maintain water levels, when the Westport Canal was built in the 1830s. The canal joins the river approximately  before the confluence with the Parrett.

Chard Reservoir was built by damming the river in the 1840s to provide water for the Chard Canal.

References

Isle, River
1Isle